Karin Abma (born 5 December 1951) is a retired Dutch rower. She was most successful in the coxless pair, winning two medals with Joke Dierdorp at the world championships of 1977 and 1978. In the coxed eights, she was fourth at the 1975 World Championships and eights at the 1976 Summer Olympics.

References

1951 births
Living people
Olympic rowers of the Netherlands
Rowers at the 1976 Summer Olympics
Dutch female rowers
Sportspeople from Arnhem
World Rowing Championships medalists for the Netherlands
20th-century Dutch women
20th-century Dutch people
21st-century Dutch women